"Sex on the Radio" is a song by American pop punk band Good Charlotte, taken from their fifth studio album Cardiology. It was released as the second single in December 2010, only in Australia and New Zealand. It was written by the band brothers Benji & Joel Madden, with additional writing from Sam Hollander and Dave Katz, with production by the two latter. The song is a pop punk track and talks about all the girls out there who make boys want to start bands and go on tour. It charted inside the top-thirty on the ARIA Singles Chart. The song received mixed reviews from music critics, some thought it was a lively and funny track, others thought it "cheesy" and that it shouldn't be on the album. A music video was made for the track, in which the band walks the street and ask people what they think of the song.

Background
Guitarist Benji Madden explained to Alternative Press that this tribute to hearing a female rock vocalist's voice on the radio is "about all the girls out there who make boys want to start bands and go on tour." According to Benji, this song reminds him of late 1970s and early 1980s bands The Cars and Cheap Trick."

Critical reception
Fraser McAlpine from BBC Music said, positively, that the song is "about listening to pop music and getting a bit too excited." Sputnikmusic's reviewer said: "There is a noticeable influx of speedy pop-punk tempos in the song “Sex on the Radio”, which provide a lively edge that was rarely seen on Good Morning Revival." A negative review came from Kevin Barber editor of Consequence of Sound who said: "Sex On The Radio should have been passed over and not included." Barber also thought that the song has "a really cheesy chorus, and it just seems that the band did not put a whole lot of effort into this song."

Music video
The music video premiered on January 29, 2011, and shows the band walking the street and asking people what they think of the song.

Charts

Certifications

References

2010 songs
2011 singles
Good Charlotte songs
Songs written by Sam Hollander
Songs written by Dave Katz
Songs written by Benji Madden
Songs written by Joel Madden
Song recordings produced by S*A*M and Sluggo
Capitol Records singles